The Kawanishi H6K was an Imperial Japanese Navy flying boat produced by the Kawanishi Aircraft Company and used during World War II for maritime patrol duties.

Design and development

The aircraft was designed in response to a Navy requirement of 1934 for a long-range flying boat and incorporated knowledge gleaned by a Kawanishi team that visited the Short Brothers factory in the UK, at that time one of the world's leading producers of flying boats, and from building the Kawanishi H3K, a license-built, enlarged version of the Short Rangoon. The "Type S", as Kawanishi called it, was a large, four-engined monoplane with twin tails, and a hull suspended beneath the parasol wing by a network of struts. Three prototypes were constructed, each one making gradual refinements to the machine's handling both in the water and in the air, and finally fitting more powerful engines. The first of these flew on 14 July 1936 and was originally designated "Navy Type 97 Flying Boat", later H6K. Eventually, 217 were built.

Operational history
H6Ks were deployed from 1938 onwards, first seeing service in the Sino-Japanese War and were in widespread use by the time the full-scale Pacific War erupted, in December 1941. At that time of the war, four Kōkūtai (air groups) operated a total of 66 H6K4s.

The type had some success over South East Asia and the South West Pacific. H6Ks had excellent endurance, being able to undertake 24-hour patrols, and were often used for long-range reconnaissance and bombing missions. From bases in the Dutch East Indies, they were able to undertake missions over a large portion of Australia.

However, the H6K became vulnerable to a newer generation of more heavily armed and faster fighters. It continued in service throughout the war, in areas where the risk of interception was low. In front-line service, it was replaced by the Kawanishi H8K.

Variants

 H6K1
Evaluation prototypes with four Nakajima Hikari 2 engines, four built.
 H6K1 (navy flying boat Type 97 Model 1)
Prototypes with 746 kW (1,000 hp) Mitsubishi Kinsei 43 engines, three converted from the original H6K1 prototypes
 H6K2 Model 11
First production model. Includes two H6K2-L officer transport modification, 10 built.
 H6K2-L (navy transport flying boat Type 97)
Unarmed transport version of H6K2 powered by Mitsubishi Kinsei 43 engines, 16 built
 H6K3 Model 21
Modified transport version of H6K2 for VIPs and high-ranking officers, 2 built
 H6K4 Model 22
Major production version, modified H6K2 with revised weapons, some with 694 kW (930 hp) Mitsubishi Kinsei 46 engines. Fuel capacity increased from 7,764 L (1,708 Imp gal) to 13,410 L (2,950 Imp gal). Includes two H6K4-L transport versions, 100 to 127 (if other numbers are all correct) built.
 H6K4-L
Transport version of H6K4, similar to H6K2-L, but with Mitsubishi Kinsei 46 engines, 20 built and another two converted from the H6K4
 H6K5 Model 23
Fitted with 969 kW (1,300 hp) Mitsubishi Kinsei 51 or 53 engines and new upper turret replacing the open position, 36 built

Operators

Air Service Volunteer Corps - A single H6K5 flying boat was restored to flight by Indonesian forces during the Indonesian War of Independence.

 Imperial Japanese Navy Air Service
 Imperial Japanese Airways
 Used on the routes Yokohama-Saipan-Koror (Palau)-Timor, Saigon-Bangkok and Saipan-Truk-Ponape-Jaluit

Specifications (H6K4 Model 22)

See also

Notes

Bibliography
 Doubilet, David. "The Flying Boat". Sport Diver Magazine. Volume 15, Number 8, September 2007.
  (new edition 1987 by Putnam Aeronautical Books, .)
 
 
 "Pentagon Over The Islands...The Thirty Year History of Indonesian Military Aviation". Air Enthusiast Quarterly. No. 2, n.d. pp. 154–162.
 Richards, M.C. "Kawanishi 4-Motor Flying-Boats (H6K 'Mavis' and H8K 'Emily')". Aircraft in Profile Volume 11. Windsor, Berkshire, UK: Profile Publications Ltd., 1972.
 Van der Klaauw, Bart. Water- en Transportvliegtuigen Wereldoorlog II (in Dutch). Alkmaar, the Netherlands: Uitgeverij de Alk. .

External links

 Duel between an HK6 and 2 B-17s

H6K
H6K, Kawanishi
Flying boats
Four-engined tractor aircraft
Parasol-wing aircraft
World War II Japanese patrol aircraft
Aircraft first flown in 1936
Four-engined piston aircraft